Frances López-Morillas, née Frances Elinor Mapes (September 3, 1918 – November 6, 2018) was an American translator of Spanish-language literature into English.

Biography 
López-Morillas was born in Fulton, Missouri, and raised in Iowa City, Iowa, as the daughter of Erwin Kempton Mapes, who was also a prominent scholar of Spanish-language literature.
She was married to the noted Hispanic scholar Juan López-Morillas from 1937 until his death in 1997. She was the translator of 23 Spanish literary and scholarly books, including works by Pérez Galdós, Camilo José Cela, Miguel Delibes, and Jorge Luis Borges. She also taught at the Wheeler School in Providence, Rhode Island, where she died at the age of 100.

Translations
 C.J. Cela, Journey to the Alcarria: Travels through the Spanish Countryside, 1964
 J. Marias, Miguel de Unamuno, 1966
 J.V. Vives, An Economic History of Spain, 1969
 J. Marias, Jose Ortega y Gasset: Circumstance and Vocation, 1970
 Spain in the Fifteenth Century, ed. by R. Highfield, 1972
 A. Boulton, Cruz Diez, 1974
 A. Boulton, Soto, 1974
 A. de Orsua y Vela, Tales of Potosi, 1975
 A. Boulton, Art in Aboriginal Venezuelan Ceramics, 1978
 J. Lopez-Morillas, The Krausist Movement and Ideological Change in Spain, 1981
 F. Savater, Childhood Regained, 1981
 M. Delibes, The Hedge, 1983
 J.L. Borges, Nine Essays on Dante, 1984
 B.P. Galdos, Torquemada, 1986
 M. Delibes, Five Hours with Mario, 1988
 C.M. Gaite, Behind the Curtains, 1990
 M. Delibes, The Stuff of Heroes, 1990
 J. Marias, Understanding Spain, 1990
 L. Weckmann, The Medieval Heritage of Mexico, 1992
 A.N. Cabeza de Vaca, Castaways: The Narrative of Alvar Nunez Cabeza de Vaca, edited by E. Pupo-Walker, 1993
 Selected Writings of Andres Bello, ed. by I. Jaksic, 1997
 J. de Acosta, Natural and Moral History of the Indies (1590), 2002

References

1918 births
2018 deaths
American centenarians
American women writers
People from Fulton, Missouri
Spanish–English translators
Women centenarians
20th-century American translators
20th-century American women
21st-century American women